Marc Christophe Fachan (born 25 January 1989) is a French footballer who plays for Bergerac Périgord FC as a right back.

Club career
Born in Tarbes, Hautes-Pyrénées, Fachan began his career at the age of six at F.C. Castelmaurou, joining AS Villeneuve in Haute-Garonne seven years later. In 2004, he moved to Tarbes Pyrénées Football where his father Jean-Louis coached, to complete his formation.

In summer 2007, Fachan signed with Ligue 1 club AJ Auxerre, playing almost exclusively with its reserves. Two years later he was released and left for Ukraine, joining FC Dynamo Kyiv. On 26 July 2009, he left the team, however, returning immediately to his homeland.

In late August 2009, Fachan moved to Gimnàstic de Tarragona in Spain. He made his Segunda División debut on 12 September against Real Sociedad, replacing veteran Mingo for the second half of a 1–2 home defeat.

Fachan did not appear in any league games in the 2010–11 season. On 10 August 2011, Nàstic and the player mutually agreed to terminate his contract and, shortly after, he signed with another side in the country, Segunda División B's Deportivo Alavés.

Fachan returned to France subsequently, where he represented, always in the Championnat National, USJA Carquefou, RC Strasbourg and USL Dunkerque. He scored a career-best seven goals for the latter club during 2017–18, mostly from penalties. On 28 October 2017, during a match against Rodez AF, he was involved in a fight with teammate Cédric Tuta as both wished to hit from the 11-meter mark; the latter, who eventually scored in the 1–3 home loss, was cut from the squad shortly after, and Fachan himself left them at the end of the campaign.

In September 2018, Fachan joined Étoile Fréjus Saint-Raphaël of the Championnat National 2. Towards the end of the 2020 January transfer window, he moved to fellow league club Bergerac Périgord FC.

International career
Fachan was first selected for France's under-19 team in December 2008, appearing on the 12th against Italy at Rende.

References

External links

1989 births
Living people
French footballers
Association football defenders
Championnat National players
Championnat National 2 players
AJ Auxerre players
USJA Carquefou players
RC Strasbourg Alsace players
USL Dunkerque players
ÉFC Fréjus Saint-Raphaël players
Bergerac Périgord FC players
FC Dynamo Kyiv players
Segunda División players
Segunda División B players
Gimnàstic de Tarragona footballers
Deportivo Alavés players
France youth international footballers
French expatriate footballers
Expatriate footballers in Ukraine
Expatriate footballers in Spain
French expatriate sportspeople in Ukraine
French expatriate sportspeople in Spain
Sportspeople from Tarbes
Footballers from Occitania (administrative region)